Rockwood (formerly Alberta) is an unincorporated community in Imperial County, California.

The name Rockwood honors Charles R. Rockwood, irrigation promoter. The Alberta post office operated from 1910 to 1914.

See also
Alamo Canal

References

Unincorporated communities in Imperial County, California
El Centro metropolitan area
Imperial Valley
Unincorporated communities in California